James Lyons (17 March 1842 – 27 July 1915) was an Irish-born Australian politician.

He was born in County Leitrim to Myles Lyons and Bridget, née Cunningham. He moved to Queensland, where he worked as a miner and timber hauler before establishing a sawmill in Cairns in 1881. He married Ellen Murphy, with whom he had nine children. He was a long-serving alderman on Cairns Shire Council, with a period as mayor from 1895 to 1896. He represented Cairns in the Queensland Legislative Assembly from 1902 to 1904 as a conservative ministerialist. In 1906 he was a founder of the Cairns Stock Exchange. He died in Cairns in 1915.

References

Members of the Queensland Legislative Assembly
1842 births
1915 deaths
Irish emigrants to colonial Australia